Susan Bronwyn Owens Hickey (born September 26, 1955) is the Chief United States district judge of the United States District Court for the Western District of Arkansas.

Early life and education 

Born in Dallas, Hickey earned a Bachelor of Arts degree in 1977 from the University of Arkansas and a Juris Doctor in 1980 from the University of Arkansas School of Law.

Professional career 
Before pursuing a legal career, she served as a Bank teller for the United Federal Savings Bank in Springdale, Arkansas in 1978.

Her legal career began in 1981 when she served as an attorney for a single trial while employed at Brown, Compton, and Prewett Ltd in El Dorado, Arkansas.

From 1981 until 1984, Hickey worked as a staff attorney at Murphy Oil Corporation. She then served as a career  law clerk to Judge Harry F. Barnes of the United States District Court for the Western District of Arkansas until 2010. In 2010, Hickey became an Arkansas Circuit Courts Judge on the Thirteenth Judicial Circuit.

Federal judicial service 

On April 6, 2011, President Obama nominated Hickey to a seat on the United States District Court for the Western District of Arkansas to fill the vacancy created when Barnes assumed senior status in 2008. The United States Senate confirmed Hickey by an 83–8 vote on October 13, 2011. She received her commission on October 19, 2011. She became Chief Judge on February 14, 2019, succeeding Paul K. Holmes III.

References

External links

1955 births
Judges of the United States District Court for the Western District of Arkansas
Living people
United States district court judges appointed by Barack Obama
21st-century American judges
University of Arkansas School of Law alumni
Arkansas state court judges
21st-century American women judges